Pierre Boutin (December 26, 1821 – December 3, 1901) was a farmer and political figure in Quebec. He represented Bellechasse in the Legislative Assembly of Quebec from 1878 to 1881 as a Liberal.

He was born in Saint-Henri, Lower Canada, the son of Pierre Boutin and Rose Morisset, and was educated there. Boutin also served as justice of the peace at Saint-Raphaël. In 1848, he married Esther Bernard. Boutin was an unsuccessful candidate in Bellechasse in an 1875 federal by-election. He was elected to the Quebec assembly in 1878, defeating the incumbent Pierre Fradet, but was defeated by Narcisse-Henri-Édouard Faucher de Saint-Maurice when he ran for reelection in 1881. Boutin died at Beauport at the age of 79 and was buried in Saint-Raphaël.

References
 

1821 births
1901 deaths
Quebec Liberal Party MNAs